The Nottinghamshire County Council Election took place on 2 May 2013 as part of the 2013 United Kingdom local elections. 67 councillors were elected from 54 electoral divisions, which returned either one or two county councillors each by first-past-the-post voting for a four-year term of office. The electoral divisions were the same as those used at the previous election in 2009. No elections were held in the City of Nottingham, which is a unitary authority outside the area covered by the County Council. The Labour Party won a narrow majority of one seat, gaining overall control from the Conservative Party who had controlled the council since the 2009 election.

Results

Results by electoral division

Ashfield District
(10 seats, 8 electoral divisions)

Hucknall

Kirkby in Ashfield North

Kirkby in Ashfield South

Selston

Sutton in Ashfield Central

Sutton in Ashfield East

Sutton in Ashfield North

Sutton in Ashfield West

Bassetlaw District
9 seats, 9 electoral divisions

Blyth & Harworth

Misterton

Retford East

Retford West

Tuxford

Worksop East

Worksop North

Worksop North East & Carlton

Worksop West

Broxtowe Borough
10 seats, 8 electoral divisions

Beauvale

Beeston North

Beeston South & Attenborough

Bramcote & Stapleford

Chilwell & Toton

Eastwood

Kimberley & Trowell

Nuthall

Gedling Borough
10 seats, 6 electoral divisions

Arnold North

Arnold South

Calverton

Carlton East

Carlton West

Newstead

Mansfield District
9 seats, 5 electoral divisions

Mansfield East

Mansfield North

Mansfield South

Mansfield West

Warsop

Newark & Sherwood District
10 seats, 10 electoral divisions

Balderton

Blidworth

Collingham

Farndon & Muskham

Farnsfield & Lowdham

Newark East

Newark West

Ollerton

Rufford

Southwell & Caunton

Rushcliffe Borough
9 seats, 8 electoral divisions

Bingham

Cotgrave

Keyworth

Radcliffe-on-Trent

Ruddington

Soar Valley

West Bridgford Central & South

West Bridgford West

By-Elections between May 2013 - May 2017

By-elections are called when a representative Councillor resigns or dies, so are unpredictable.  A by-election is held to fill a political office that has become vacant between the scheduled elections.

Ollerton - 18 December 2014

Selston - 24 November 2015

Notes and references
Notes 
 
References

2013
2013 English local elections
2010s in Nottinghamshire